Canettemont is a commune in the Pas-de-Calais department in the Hauts-de-France region of France.

Geography
A small farming village located 20 miles (32 km) west of Arras at the junction of the D53 with the D84.

Population

Places of interest
 The church of Notre-Dame dates from the sixteenth century.

See also
Communes of the Pas-de-Calais department

References

Communes of Pas-de-Calais